Timothy Wright (June 17, 1947 – April 24, 2009), generally credited as Rev. Timothy Wright or Reverend Timothy Wright on recordings, was an American gospel singer and pastor.

Biography
Reverend Timothy Wright started on piano at age 12, and sang and composed for his church choir as a teenager at the St. John's Fire Baptized Holiness Church of God in Brooklyn. He played piano for Bishop F. D. Washington and Isaac Douglas in the 1960s and 1970s, including on recordings, and he formed his own gospel ensemble in the mid-1970s, the Timothy Wright Concert Choir. He eventually became pastor of the Pentecostal Grace Tabernacle Christian Center Church of God in Christ located in Crown Heights, Brooklyn, and issued albums regularly from 1990.

Wright's 1994 album Come Thou Almighty King, with the New York Fellowship Mass Choir, made Billboard’s Top 20 chart for gospel albums and was nominated for a Grammy Award for Best Traditional Soul Gospel Album, as was his 1999 release Been There Done That.  On the heels of this success, Wright and the New York Fellowship Mass Choir appeared in a 1995 episode of the television show New York Undercover.

On July 4, 2008, Wright was critically injured in a car crash on Interstate 80 in Pennsylvania, a crash which killed his wife and grandson as well as the driver of the oncoming car. He died April 24, 2009, as a result of these injuries, at the age of 61.

Discography

References

2009 deaths
Road incident deaths in Pennsylvania
American gospel singers
1947 births
Musicians from Brooklyn
American Pentecostals
Members of the Church of God in Christ
Church of God in Christ pastors
20th-century American singers